Magda Expelled (Hungarian: Magdát kicsapják) is a 1938 Hungarian comedy film directed by Ladislao Vajda and starring Ida Turay, Klári Tolnay and Antal Páger. The film was based on a play. In 1940 it was remade in Italy as Maddalena, Zero for Conduct with some changes (such as the recipient of the letter being from Vienna rather than London).

Synopsis
A schoolgirl accidentally sends a love letter written by one of her female teachers to a handsome lawyer in London, leading to a series of misunderstandings which are eventually resolved.

Cast
 Ida Turay as Lévay Magda 
 Klári Tolnay as Makray Erzsébet, the teacher of commercial correspondence
 Antal Páger as Alfred Harvey  
 György Nagy as Horvay István, Harvey's nephew
 Piri Peéry as the school director
 Sándor Góth as the chemistry teacher
 Gyula Gózon as Magda's father  
 Márta Fónay as a student  
 Valéria Hidvéghy as a student 
 Gerő Mály as the janitor
 Erzsi Pártos as a student  
 Kató Fényes 
 Judith Laszlo
 Veronika Radó
 Magda Révfalvy
 Lili Szász 
 István Dózsa 
 István Falussy
 Aranka Hahnel 
 Gusztáv Harasztos 
 Gyula Justh 
 Terus Kováts 
 Márta Lendvay 
 Sándor Pethes 
 Mária Román 
 Zsuzsa Simon 
 Irén Sitkey 
 Éva Somogyi 
 Mária Szemlér

References

Bibliography 
 Reich, Jacqueline & Garofalo, Piero. Re-viewing Fascism: Italian Cinema, 1922-1943. Indiana University Press, 2002.

External links 

1938 films
Hungarian comedy films
1938 comedy films
1930s Hungarian-language films
Films directed by Ladislao Vajda
Films set in Hungary
Films set in London
Hungarian films based on plays
Hungarian black-and-white films